Robert Bruce Macon (July 6, 1859 – October 9, 1925) was a U.S. Representative from Arkansas.

Macon was born near Trenton, Arkansas, and was left an orphan at the age of nine. He attended the public schools and studied at home, and  engaged in agricultural pursuits. He studied law and was admitted to the bar in 1891. He commenced practice in Helena, Arkansas. He served as member of the Arkansas House of Representatives from 1883 to 1887, as clerk of the circuit court from 1892 to 1896, and as prosecuting attorney for the first judicial district from 1898 to 1902.

Macon was elected as a Democrat to the Fifty-eighth and to the four succeeding Congresses (March 4, 1903 – March 3, 1913). He was an unsuccessful candidate for renomination in 1912. He continued the practice of law in Helena, Arkansas, until he retired in 1917. He died in Marvell, Arkansas, October 9, 1925 and was interred in Elmwood Cemetery, Memphis, Tennessee.

References

1859 births
1925 deaths
Democratic Party members of the United States House of Representatives from Arkansas
Democratic Party members of the Arkansas House of Representatives